The 1998 Russian Figure Skating Championships were held in Moscow on 11–14 December 1997. Skaters competed in the disciplines of men's singles, ladies' singles, pair skating, and ice dancing. The results were one of the criteria used to pick the Russian teams to the 1998 World Championships and the 1998 European Championships.

Senior results

Men

Ladies

Pairs

Ice dancing

External links
 results

1997 in figure skating
Russian Figure Skating Championships, 1998
Figure skating
Russian Figure Skating Championships
December 1997 sports events in Russia